Goubetto, also spelled Goubétto, is a town in Djibouti. Located in the Ali Sabieh region, it is served by a station on the Ethio-Djibouti Railways. The eastern part of the same plateau is crossed by numerous valleys and dry watercourses. Goat and camel raising form the basis of the economy.

Overview
Goubetto is served by a station on the meter gauge Ethio-Djibouti Railway. A notable feature of the meter-gauge railway is a viaduct, that was built in 1900. Nearby towns and villages include Chabelley (15 km), Holhol (18 km), Djibouti City (26 km) and Arta (21 km).

Demographics
As of 2015, the population of Goubetto has been estimated to be 1,400. The town inhabitants belong to various mainly Afro-Asiatic-speaking ethnic groups, with the Issa Somali predominant.

Climate
Goubetto has a hot arid climate (BWh) by the Köppen-Geiger system.

See also 
 Railway stations in Djibouti

References 
 Goubétto

Populated places in Djibouti